The Blackwater Reservoir is a reservoir created behind a dam in the mountains above Kinlochleven, Lochaber, Highland, Scotland.

The hydroelectric scheme was constructed in the early 1900s for the  British Aluminium Company for the purpose of smelting aluminium and was designed by engineers Patrick Meik and Charles Meik. Chief assistant resident engineer was William Halcrow.

The dam was built using hand tools, without the benefit of mechanical earth moving machinery, and has been described as the last major creation of the traditional 'navvy'.

The power house and aluminium smelting plant were situated in Kinlochleven, which is adjacent to the sea loch Loch Leven.

The power station now produces electricity for the aluminium smelter in Fort William, supplementing the supply from the Lochaber hydroelectric scheme. Surplus energy is sold to the national grid for public supply.

A number of workers lost their lives constructing the dam; their graves, which are marked by concrete markers, are close to the dam.

During the First World War, German prisoners worked on laying a pipe down the hillside from the dam.

See also 
List of reservoirs and dams in the United Kingdom

References

External links
BBC One - Making Scotland's Landscape, Scotland's Water, Blackwater Dam
Blackwater Reservoir, Kinlochleven
Blackwater Reservoir, Dam on Canmore

Reservoirs in Highland (council area)
Lochaber